Pedro Filipe Figueiredo Rodrigues (born 20 May 1997), also known as Pêpê, is a Portuguese professional footballer who plays for Segunda División club Cartagena, on loan from Olympiacos, as a midfielder.

Club career

Benfica
Born in Sátão, Viseu District, Rodrigues joined S.L. Benfica's youth system at the age of 12 from local Associação Social Cultural e Recreativa e Desportista da Casa do Benfica de Viseu. On 26 August 2015, still a junior, he made his professional debut with the former's reserves, playing the entire 1–0 home win against U.D. Oliveirense in the Segunda Liga.

Rodrigues scored his first goal in the competition on 13 February 2016, in a 2–2 away draw with Académico Viseu FC. In the 2016–17 season, he netted four times (all from penalties) from 38 appearances to help the side finish in fourth position.

On 21 August 2017, Rodrigues joined G.D. Estoril Praia on a loan deal. He made his Primeira Liga debut with the club six days later, coming on as a late substitute in the 2–1 away loss to Sporting CP.

Rodrigues scored his first goal in the Portuguese top division on 30 January 2018, helping the hosts defeat C.D. Tondela 3–0 with an early long-range shot.

Vitória Guimarães
Ahead of the 2018–19 campaign, Rodrigues was loaned to Vitória de Guimarães. On 16 July 2019, he agreed to a permanent five-year contract.

Rodrigues scored five competitive goals during his spell at the Estádio D. Afonso Henriques. His first arrived on 8 August 2019 in the 3–0 away victory over FK Ventspils in the third qualifying round of the UEFA Europa League, and he repeated the feat in the second leg (6–0).

Olympiacos
On 7 September 2020, Olympiacos F.C. announced the signing of Rodrigues on a five-year deal, for a transfer fee in the range of €4 million. In the following transfer window, he was loaned to F.C. Famalicão until 30 June; the move was extended for the entire 2021–22.

International career
All youth levels comprised, Rodrigues won 78 caps for Portugal. His first for the under-21s occurred on 11 October 2016 at the age of 19, replacing Daniel Podence at the hour mark of the 7–1 away demolition of Liechtenstein for the 2017 UEFA European Championship qualifiers.

Additionally, Rodrigues represented the nation at the 2017 FIFA U-20 World Cup in South Korea.

Career statistics

Club

References

External links

Portuguese League profile 

1997 births
Living people
People from Sátão
Sportspeople from Viseu District
Portuguese footballers
Association football midfielders
Primeira Liga players
Liga Portugal 2 players
Académico de Viseu F.C. players
S.L. Benfica B players
G.D. Estoril Praia players
Vitória S.C. players
F.C. Famalicão players
Super League Greece players
Olympiacos F.C. players
Süper Lig players
MKE Ankaragücü footballers
Portugal youth international footballers
Portugal under-21 international footballers
Portuguese expatriate footballers
Expatriate footballers in Greece
Expatriate footballers in Turkey
Portuguese expatriate sportspeople in Greece
Portuguese expatriate sportspeople in Turkey